Martín Gaitán (born June 15, 1978 in Paraná) is a former Argentine rugby union footballer and a current coach. He played as a centre.

Gaitán started his career with Club Atlético San Isidro in 1997. He soon earned his debut for the national team, playing against the United States team in 1998. He then spent most of the next four years playing sevens.

In 2002, Gaitán moved to France to play for Biarritz and in 2003 he was selected to be part of the Argentina Rugby World Cup squad. He was selected to play for Argentina at the 2007 tournament, but a scan revealed that he had a blocked artery in his heart, this meant that missed the tournament in order to have surgery. He eventually had to retire from rugby because of this.

He has been the assistant coach for the National senior side under head coach Daniel Hourcade since 2013.

External links
RWC2003 profile

1978 births
Living people
People from Paraná, Entre Ríos
Argentine rugby union players
Rugby union centres
Club Atlético San Isidro rugby union players
Biarritz Olympique players
Argentina international rugby union players
Argentina international rugby sevens players
Sportspeople from Entre Ríos Province